Jeeves is a fictional character created by writer P. G. Wodehouse.

Jeeves may also refer to:
Jeeves (ERP system), a software developer in Sweden and its product
Frank Jeeves (1927–2010), Australian rules footballer
Malcolm Alexander Jeeves (b. 1926), a British Psychologist
Percy Jeeves (1888–1916), English cricketer
Jeeves, a Disney character from the Donald Duck universe

See also
Ask.com, a web search engine originally named Ask Jeeves